Paracymus elegans is a species of water scavenger beetles in the subfamily Hydrophilinae. It is found in the Southern California.

References

External links 
 

 
 Paracymus elegans at insectoid.info
 Paracymus elegans at gbif.org

Beetles described in 1901
Hydrophilinae
Fauna of California